The 2004 1. divisjon was a Norwegian second-tier football season. The season kicked off on 12 April 2004, and the final round was played on 31 October 2004.

Start were promoted to the 2005 Tippeligaen as First Division winners, along with Aalesund who finished second. Start will be playing in the top division for the first time since 2002. Aalesund, meanwhile, returned to the top flight after being relegated in 2003.

As in previous seasons, there was a two-legged promotion play-off at the end of the season, between the third-placed team in the 1. divisjon (Kongsvinger) and the twelfth-placed team in the Tippeligaen (Bodø/Glimt). Bodø/Glimt kept their spot in the Tippeligaen, beating Kongsvinger 4–1 on aggregate.

League table

Relegated teams 
These two teams were relegated from the Tippeligaen in 2003. 12th-place finishers Vålerenga defeated Sandefjord in the playoff to retain their spot in the highest division.
Aalesund
Bryne

Promoted teams 

These four teams were promoted from the 2. divisjon in 2003:
Pors Grenland
Kongsvinger
Vard Haugesund
Tromsdalen

See also 
2004 in Norwegian football
2004 Tippeligaen
2004 2. divisjon
2004 3. divisjon

Norwegian First Division seasons
2
Norway
Norway